Samut Songkhram Stadium is a multi-use stadium in Samut Songkhram Province, Thailand.  It is used mostly for football matches and is the home stadium of Samutsongkhram F.C. of Thai League 2. The stadium holds 6,000 people.

Football venues in Thailand
Samut Songkhram province